4 for Texas is a 1963 American comedy Western film starring Frank Sinatra, Dean Martin, Anita Ekberg, and Ursula Andress, and featuring Charles Bronson and Mike Mazurki, with a cameo appearance by Arthur Godfrey and the Three Stooges (Larry Fine, Moe Howard, and Curly Joe DeRita). The film was written by Teddi Sherman and Robert Aldrich, who also directed.

Plot 
In 1870, a shipment of $100,000 being transported by stagecoach to Galveston, Texas, is the object of a tug-of-war in the desert between Zack Thomas and Joe Jarrett, who first must stave off an outlaw band led by Matson.

Later, in Galveston, Thomas and Jarrett become rivals in a bid to open a waterfront casino. Each has a new romantic attachment, as well, with the beauties Elya and Maxine, respectively. They eventually must join forces to hold off the villainous Matson and a corrupt banker, Burden, to keep their new gambling boat afloat.

Cast 

 Frank Sinatra as Zack Thomas
 Dean Martin as Joe Jarrett
 Anita Ekberg as Elya Carlson
 Ursula Andress as Maxine Richter
 Charles Bronson as Matson
 Victor Buono as Harvey Burden (President, Galveston Savings & Trust)
 Edric Connor as Prince George (carriage driver)
 Nick Dennis as Angel
 Richard Jaeckel as Pete Mancini
 Mike Mazurki as Chad (Zack's bodyguard)
 Wesley Addy as Winthrop Trowbridge
 Marjorie Bennett as Miss Emmaline
 Virginia Christine as Elya Carlson's maid
 Ellen Corby as Widow
 Jack Elam as Dobie
 Joe DeRita as Painting Deliveryman (billed as the Three Stooges)
 Larry Fine as Painting Deliveryman (billed as the Three Stooges)
 Moe Howard as Painting Deliveryman (billed as the Three Stooges)
 Jack Lambert as Monk
 Barbara Payton as Town Citizen (uncredited)

Production

Development and writing
Aldrich announced the film in November 1960 as Two for Texas, from a script by Teddi Sherman. The proposed stars were Lisa Kirk, Martine Carol and Aldo Ray.

Aldrich later said he wrote the first draft of the script but "you could change that over and over and it was still a disaster." Eventually Aldrich and Sherman shared the writing credit, with some sources stating that W. R. Burnett contributed uncredited work to the screenplay.

In January 1963, Dean Martin signed to make the film. At that stage his female co-stars would be Anita Ekberg and (it was hoped) Gina Lollobrigida. Warner Bros., who had just made Whatever Happened to Baby Jane? with Aldrich, agreed to finance.

In March, Frank Sinatra agreed to co-star. This meant the film would be a co-production between Warners, Aldrich's company, the Associates and Aldrich, Martin's company, Claude Productions, and Sinatra's, Essex Productions.

At one stage the role of Elya was originally intended for Sophia Loren, who had already worked with Sinatra in The Pride and the Passion. Although she was offered $1,000,000 for four weeks of work, Loren turned the part down.

Lollobrigida decided not to do the film. In May, Ursula Andress joined the cast and the film was retitled Four for Texas.

Filming
Filming started in May 1963.

4 for Texas was filmed in 1.85:1 aspect ratio and processed by Technicolor. Its promotional trailer features Ursula Andress in specially shot footage addressing the audience.

During production, the relationship between star Sinatra and director Aldrich became strained. Aldrich felt the film was not a success, and cited problems with his own script, as well as Sinatra's lack of enthusiasm for the project—Aldrich calculated that Sinatra worked a total of only 80 hours during 37 days of filming.

At one stage, Bette Davis was going to make a cameo. A role had also apparently been written for Peter Lawford, but after Sinatra expelled Lawford from the Rat Pack, Lawford's role was written out.

Release

Theatrical
The film had its U.S. premiere on December 18, 1963. Forty-three years after its original premiere, 4 for Texas was presented at the Turin Film Festival on November 12, 2006.

Home media
Its first DVD release arrived on November 20, 2001, and the second release (as part of The Rat Pack collection of Ocean's 11 and Robin and the 7 Hoods) was on June 13, 2006.

Reception

Accolades
It was nominated for the Golden Laurel as "Top Action Drama", ultimately coming in fourth.

See also
 List of American films of 1963

References

External links 
 
 
 
 
 

1963 films
1960s English-language films
1960s Western (genre) comedy films
American Western (genre) comedy films
Films directed by Robert Aldrich
Films scored by Nelson Riddle
Warner Bros. films
Films set in Texas
Films set in 1870
1963 comedy films
1960s American films